Donald C. "Donny" Olson (born June 18, 1953) is an American physician, attorney, commercial pilot, reindeer herder, and politician, currently serving as a member of the Alaska Senate, representing the T district since 2001.

Early life
Olson was born in the Inupiat village of Golovin, Alaska, where he resides to date. He graduated from Covenant High School in Unalakleet,<ref>Shareholder Spotlight: Dr. Donny Olson, Bering Straits Native Corporation, April 23, 2019. Retrieved July 7, 2022.</ref> attended Seattle Pacific College; then the University of Minnesota, Duluth, where he received a B.A. in Chemistry; attended the University of Alaska, Fairbanks; the Oral Roberts University School of Medicine in Tulsa, Oklahoma, where he received his M.D., the University of Colorado School of Law for his Juris Doctor, and did postgraduate work in law at Cambridge University in England.

Career
He is the president and CEO of Olson Air Service, based in Nome, Alaska.

He was appointed to the Alaska State Medical Board by Governor Tony Knowles in 1995 and served until taking office in the Alaska Senate in 2001. He was the sole Democrat associated with the Alaska political corruption probe. He was the only Alaska legislator to reject a bribe offer to vote for an oil tax bill. It was proposed as a campaign contribution of $25,000 for his 2004 Lieutenant Governor's race. He subsequently helped the FBI make their case against those involved.

Olson caucused with the Republicans in the majority during the 28th Senate, from 2013 to 2014, but he was not invited to participate in the organization of the majority caucus for the 29th Senate. He is currently a member of the Democratic minority caucus.

References

External links

 Alaska State Legislature - Senator Donald Olson official AK Senate website
 Project Vote Smart - Representative Donald Olson (AK) profile
 Follow the Money - Donald Olson
 2006 2004 2000 Senate campaign contributions
 2006 Lieutenant Governor campaign contributions
 Donny Olson at 100 Years of Alaska's Legislature''

1953 births
Living people
Aviators
20th-century American physicians
21st-century American physicians
20th-century Native Americans
21st-century Native Americans
21st-century American politicians
Democratic Party Alaska state senators
Businesspeople from Alaska
Inupiat people
Native American physicians
Native American state legislators in Alaska
Oral Roberts University alumni
People from Nome, Alaska
Physicians from Alaska
University of Minnesota alumni